The 2007 Asian Indoor Games, officially known as the 2nd Asian Indoor Games and also known as Macau 2007 were held in Macau, China from 26 October 2007 to 3 November 2007. Most events of the games took place at the Macao East Asian Games Dome.

The Emblem of the 2nd Asian Indoor Games gives an overall impression of the sun shining above the covered gymnasium.

Venues
 Macau East Asian Games Dome
 Tap Seac Multisport Pavilion
 IPM Multisport Pavilion
 Macau Olympic Aquatic Centre
 Macao Forum
 Luso-Chinesa School Pavilion
 MUST Pavilion
 Workers Sports Pavilion

Participating nations 
There are 44 Asian countries confirmed to participate in the game.

Sports
A total of 17 sports were scheduled to be competed in this edition of the Indoor Asiad. The following is a list of the sports and the number of the designated events in parentheses. 

Demonstration sports

Calendar

Medal table

References

External links
Macau Indoor Games Official Website

 
Asian Games
Asian Indoor Games
Asian Indoor Games, 2007
Asian Games
2007 in Asian sport
Multi-sport events in Macau